Daniel Hančák (born January 3, 1984) is a Slovak professional ice hockey player. He currently plays for HK 2016 Trebišov of the Slovak 2. Liga.

Hančák previously played for HC Slovan Bratislava MHC Martin, HK Dukla Trenčín and Arlan Kokshetau.

Career statistics

Regular season and playoffs

References

External links
 

1984 births
Living people
Sportspeople from Spišská Nová Ves
Slovak ice hockey defencemen
HC Slovan Bratislava players
HK 2016 Trebišov players
HK Trnava players
MHC Martin players
HK Dukla Trenčín players
HK Spišská Nová Ves players
HK Dukla Michalovce players
Arlan Kokshetau players
Expatriate ice hockey players in Kazakhstan
Slovak expatriate ice hockey people
Slovak expatriate sportspeople in Kazakhstan